John Culbertson may refer to:
 John Culbertson (economist), American professor of economics
 John Bolt Culbertson, member of the South Carolina House of Representatives
 John T. Culbertson Jr., Illinois lawyer and judge

See also
 John Culberson, former member of the U.S. House of Representatives